The University of Medical Sciences, Cienfuegos (also Medicine School of Cienfuegos: Dr. Raúl Dorticós Torrado) was established in 1979 in Cienfuegos, Cuba. Provincial General Hospital "Dr. Gustavo Aldereguía Lima" is affiliated to the university. Currently, students from 52 countries are registered in different departments.

References

External links 

  Universidad de Ciencias Médicas de Cienfuegos (Spanish)

Medical Sciences Cienfuegos
Buildings and structures in Cienfuegos
Cienfuegos